The Walvis Bay 2-4-2T Hope of 1899 was a South African steam locomotive from the pre-Union era in the Cape of Good Hope.

In 1899, the Walvis Bay Tramway in the British territory of Walvis Bay, a Cape of Good Hope exclave in German South West Africa, placed a single  locomotive in service. It remained in service until 1915, when a Cape gauge railway was opened between Swakopmund and Walvis Bay.

Walvis Bay Tramway
The Walvis Bay railway began as a  gauge horse-drawn tramway within the confines of the harbour town. The gauge was most probably selected to ensure a wide enough path for horses between the rails, as was probably also the case on the light mule-drawn Namaqualand Railway which was built to the same gauge between Port Nolloth and O'okiep in northwestern Cape of Good Hope.

Manufacturer
In June 1899, a single  locomotive was shipped from Kerr, Stuart and Company of Stoke-on-Trent in England. It arrived in Walvis Bay on 22 August 1899 aboard the barque Primera, along with a distilling plant, railway trucks and 200 tons of coal. The engine was named Hope and was placed in service on the short Walfish Bay Tramway.

The locomotive was a standard Sirdar class engine, similar to the two Class NG1  locomotives which were to enter service on the Bezuidenhout Light Railway a year later during the Second Boer War, but with leading and trailing pony wheels added and a tropical cab roof. Kerr, Stuart was a supplier of contractor's engines and often built locomotives to standard designs, but without frame stretchers and axles. These semi-completed locomotives were kept in stock until an order was placed. This allowed them to be delivered with a minimum of delay.

Characteristics
It used Murdoch's D type slide valves, actuated by Stephenson valve gear through rocker arms.

It had coupled wheels of  diameter.

Walvis Bay Railway
In 1899, the Cape government began to extend the tramway as a railway to a terminus named Plum,  due east of Walvis Bay near Rooibank, essentially in the middle of the Namib desert on the DSWA border. The decision to build the  railway between the harbour and the international border with DSWA followed the start of construction of the Swakopmund-Windhuk Staatsbahn in DSWA in 1897 and was an attempt to not forfeit freight trade opportunities into the interior once that line was completed.

The object with the railway was to bridge the region of shifting sand dunes between the harbour and the interior so that goods could be forwarded by rail to Plum and then by ox wagon from there into the interior. The extension was completed in 1903, but saw very limited use, mainly to obtain firewood and to render possible the occasional picnic in the desert.

Service
The engine Hope operated on the railway for some five years, until it became apparent by 1904 that the short link had no economic benefit. In March 1905, the Acting Magistrate reported an income over two years of £39 against expenditure of £1,200.

The main reason for the abandonment of the railway was the opening of the copper mines at Tsumeb and the construction of the Otavi Railway, which commenced in November 1903 to connect Tsumeb with the port of Swakopmund, just north of the DSWA border.

Preservation
After a Cape gauge railway was opened between Swakopmund and Walvis Bay in March 1915, the locomotive remained stored in a local siding in Walvis Bay for years, until it was repaired for preservation by the South African Railways administration and plinthed in Windhoek during the 1940s. It was returned to Walvis Bay in 1963, to be plinthed at Walvis Bay railway station. To protect it against Walvis Bay's notoriously corrosive sea air, the engine has since been enclosed in a glass cage.

Illustration

References

1000
1000
2-4-2T locomotives
1′B1′ n2t locomotives
Kerr Stuart locomotives
2 ft 6 in gauge locomotives
Railway locomotives introduced in 1899
1899 in South Africa